Sharif Badmash is a 1975 Pakistani action musical drama film directed by Iqbal Kashmiri and produced by Chodhary Mohammad Ajmal of Quality Pictures. 

It stars Mumtaz, Yousuf Khan, Aasia and Sultan Rahi, and features Mustafa Qureshi, Afzal Ahmed and Asad Bukhari in supporting roles.

Cast 
 Mumtaz as Guddo
 Yousuf Khan as Bao Shareef
 Aasia as Balli
 Sultan Rahi as Nadir Badmash
 Munawar Zarif as Misri
 Ilyas Kashmiri as Jailor
 Afzal Ahmed as Jaggu
 Mustafa Qureshi as Manggu
 Asad Bukhari as Akku
 Shahida as Billo
 Seema as Bali's mother
 Atia Sharif as Masterji's daughter
 Naeem Hashmi as Masterji
 Farah Jalal
 Hamid
 Rangoon Wala
 Chohan
 Agha Dilraj
 Fazal Haq - Thekedar
 Jani - Chanti

Soundtrack 

All songs, except one were composed by Master Abdullah. The film song lyrics were composed by Hazin Qadri.

Track list

References

Pakistani action drama films
1970s action drama films
Pakistani crime action films
Punjabi-language Pakistani films
1975 films
Nigar Award winners
1970s Punjabi-language films
1970s masala films